The Virginia House of Delegates election of 2013 was held on Tuesday, November 5.

Delegates not running for re-election

Results

Overview

Seats that changed hands 
 Democratic to Republican (1)
 4th district

 Independent to Republican (1)
 19th district

 Republican to Democratic (2)
 2nd district
 93rd district

See also 
 United States elections, 2013
 Virginia elections, 2013
 Virginia gubernatorial election, 2013
 Virginia lieutenant gubernatorial election, 2013
 Virginia Attorney General election, 2013

Notes

References 

House of Delegates
Virginia House of Delegates elections
Virginia House of Delegates